Tichosina is a genus of brachiopods belonging to the family Terebratulidae.

The species of this genus are found in Southern America.

Species

Species:

Tichosina abrupta 
Tichosina bahamiensis 
Tichosina barschi

References

Brachiopod genera
Terebratulida